Gough is a surname.

Gough may also refer to:

Places
 Gough, Georgia, in Burke County
 Gough County, New South Wales
 Gough Glacier, Antarctica
 Gough Island, also known historically as Diego Alvarez, a volcanic British island in the South Atlantic Ocean
 Gough Lake, Alberta, Canada
 Gough Street in Hong Kong

Given name
 Gough McCormick (1874–1924), English cleric, Dean of Manchester from 1920
 Gough Whitlam (1916–2014), Prime Minister of Australia from 1972 to 1975

Other uses
 Gough finch (Rowettia goughensis), a finch-like bird from the Gough Island
 Gough moorhen (Gallinula comeri), native to Gough Island
 Gough Map, the oldest surviving road map of Great Britain
 "Gough" (song), a song by The Whitlams
 Gough/Stewart platform, a type of parallel robot